Leubringhen is a commune in the Pas-de-Calais department in the Hauts-de-France region of France.

Geography
The A16 autoroute cuts through the middle of the commune's territory.

Population

Places of interest
 The church of St.Martin, dating from the twelfth century.
 The ruins of a 12th-century castle at the hamlet of Blacourt.
 The Commonwealth War Graves Commission cemetery.

See also
Communes of the Pas-de-Calais department

References

External links

 Website about the commune 
 The Canadian cemetery

Communes of Pas-de-Calais